Montserrat Bassa i Coll (born 20 April 1965) is a Spanish politician from Catalonia who serves as Member of the Congress of Deputies of Spain.

Early life
Bassa was born on 20 April 1965 in Torroella de Montgrí, Catalonia. She is the sister of jailed Catalan minister Dolors Bassa.

Career
Bassa was director of Escola d'Adults de Figueres and later worked for the Department of Education at the ancient ruins of Empúries.

Bassa is a founding member of the Catalan Association for Civil Rights (Associació Catalana pels Drets Civils) which represents families of Catalan "political prisoners and exiles". She contested the 2019 general election as a Republican Left of Catalonia–Sovereigntists electoral alliance candidate in the Province of Girona and was elected to the Congress of Deputies.

Electoral history

References

External links

1965 births
Women politicians from Catalonia
Independent politicians in Catalonia
Living people
Members of the 13th Congress of Deputies (Spain)
People from Baix Empordà
Women members of the Congress of Deputies (Spain)
Members of the 14th Congress of Deputies (Spain)